The Institute of Education and Research, University of Dhaka(), (also known as IER, University of Dhaka or simply IER), is the oldest and biggest institution for the study of education in Bangladesh. The institute of Education and Research was established as the first institute of the University of Dhaka with the technical and financial assistance of United States Agency for International Development (USAID). It is run by the Second Statute Under President's Order of 1973 and governed by a separate Board of Governors headed by the Vice-Chancellor of the University.

Bachelor of Education (Honors) program

In the mid-nineties IER felt the necessity of preparing specialized manpower for different sectors of Education. With a view to proving solid foundation required for such specialization, a 3-year Bachelor of Education (Honors) program was introduced from the session 1994–95. Keeping pace with the duration of undergraduate programs of other disciplines of the University, IER extended the duration of Bachelor of Education (Honors) program from 3 years to 4 years.

Departments of IER
With the aim of preparing competent for different specialized areas of education, IER has reconstructed its departments. Now M.Ed., MPhil and PhD programs are offered under the following ten departments.

 Department of Pre-Primary and Primary Education (PPE)
 Department of Language Education (LE)
 Department of Social Science Education (SSE)
 Department of Science, Mathematics and Technology Education (SMTE)
 Department of Curriculum and Instructional Technology (CIT)
 Department of Educational Administration (EA)
 Department of Educational Psychology and Guidance (EPG)
 Department of Educational Evaluation and Research (EER)
 Department of Non-formal and Continuing Education (NFCE)
 Department of Special Education (PPE)

Offering diploma/degree

IER offers the following teaching programs leading to Diploma/Degree in Education

 Four-year Bachelor of Education (Honors)
 One-year Master of Education (Regular)
 (One-year and Two-year) Master of Education (Professional)
 Two-year M.Phil
 Ph.D in Education

Publications

IER publishes a journal under the title "Teacher's World" bi-yearly. The journal provides an opportunity to publish research and creative articles by the faculty members and other professionals.

Notable alumni
 Sirajul Haque Khan, educationist and martyred intellectual of 1971 
 Musa Ibrahim, the first Bangladeshi to reach the summit of Mount Everest

References

External links
 http://www.du.ac.bd/academic/department_item/IER

University of Dhaka
Education research institutes in Bangladesh